Projectplace is a collaborative work management software from Planview that offers project management software and work collaboration solutions. Projectplace integrates features such as task manager apps, Kanban boards, and Gantt chart software. Originally, Projectplace was founded in September 1998 in Stockholm, Sweden, from the Swedish application service provider, Projectplace International AB.

Projectplace modules include team conversations, document archives, issue management, planning and tracking, meeting management, project portal, and contacts.

The service is available in several languages: Swedish, Norwegian, Dutch, English, German, French, Spanish and Danish.

Analyst Recognition
 451 Research Report claims Projectplace brings a collaborative edge to Planview’s project management portfolio.
 Forrester Research identifies Projectplace as a leader in the rapidly growing work collaboration market.
 Constellation Research names Projectplace to the 2016 Constellation ShortList for Social Task Management.

See also
Computer-supported collaboration
List of project management software

References

Langham, Martin. "ProjectPlace Gets IT Documents In Focus" Bloor Research: Sep. 14. 2004.
Plugge, Leo, et al. "Using EPO to Stimulate Learning in the Health Sciences". Maastricht University.

Project management software
Groupware
1998 software
Projects established in 1998